The May 1 riots, or EDSA III (pronounced as EDSA Three or EDSA Tres, the Spanish word for "three"), were protests sparked by the arrest of newly deposed president Joseph Estrada of the Philippines from April 25 to May 1, 2001. The protest was held for seven days on a major highway in Metro Manila, Epifanio de los Santos Avenue (EDSA), which eventually culminated in an attempt to storm Malacañang. 

Taking place four months after the Second EDSA Revolution, the protests were considered as a more populist uprising in comparison to the previous demonstrations in the same location in January 2001. The protests and the attack on the presidential palace, however, failed in their objectives. Participants continue to claim that it was a genuine People Power event, a claim disputed by the participants and supporters of EDSA II. President Gloria Macapagal Arroyo has acknowledged the divisive nature of the two terminologies by saying in one statement that she hoped to be the president of "EDSA II and EDSA III".

April 24

On April 24, 2001, the Sandiganbayan had ordered the arrest of Estrada, his son San Juan mayor Jinggoy Estrada, gambling consultant Charlie "Atong" Ang, and lawyer Edward Serapio over charges of plunder and graft. As early as 6:00 am the next day, six thousand police officers at Camp Crame in Quezon City stood by for the order to arrest Estrada, headed by Philippine National Police (PNP) chief Director-General Leandro Mendoza alongside troopers of the Philippine Marine Corps and the PNP Special Action Force in seven vehicles and five buses.

However, an estimated 6,000 loyalists of Estrada had mobilized to Greenhills in San Juan City to block the police and military from arresting the former president, who lived inside the North Greenhills subdivision. The PNP had floated the possibility of having to forcibly airlift Estrada from his home with airborne troops if the police squad headed by Mendoza was unable to enter the subdivision, as loyalists blocked the combined police and military forces from accessing the subdivision's Buchanan gate along Club Filipino Avenue with a blockade made out of jeepneys and human barricades. 

At 2:00 pm, the situation between the police and the loyalists became tense when anti-riot personnel began approaching the human barricades. Out of fear of antagonizing the loyalists and instigating a riot, the anti-riot personnel withdrew. However, at around 3 pm, the police and military forces aborted the operation for the day as the Sandiganbayan had not yet issued the warrant for Estrada's arrest.

April 25–30
On April 25, the Sandiganbayan had finally issued the arrest order at noon. At 3:00 pm, court-appointed sheriff Ed Urieta, two thousand police officers, and troopers of the Philippine Marine Corps accompanied by PNP Chief Mendoza arrived at Estrada's home and served the warrant. The arresting team escorted Estrada and his son Jinggoy into a PNP-owned Toyota Coaster to take them both to a detention center at Camp Crame. Estrada's lawyers were able to persuade the police to let them ride in a private vehicle instead of the police Coaster, as armed police officers escorted a privately-owned van as it moved out of the North Greenhills subdivision towards Camp Crame.

After both Estrada and his son were processed and put into a cell, Estrada released a statement maintaining his innocence and denounced the Arroyo government's efforts to persecute him as a "violation of his human rights", calling Filipinos to "witness this denial of justice and mockery of the Bill of Rights."

As a result, a crowd of an alleged 700,000 loyalists (although according to Eagle Broadcasting Corporation-owned broadcast network Net 25 and to Senator Tito Sotto, a high of over 3 million in the evening from April 25–30), most of whom were members of the urban poor and devotees of the Iglesia ni Cristo, which institutionally supported Estrada, gathered at the Roman Catholic EDSA Shrine, the site of the January EDSA II revolt that had toppled Estrada from the presidency. 

News organizations aiming to cover the rally were advised not to approach the area, as there were reports of stones being thrown at cameramen, particularly those from ABS-CBN. 

The protest was led by members of the political opposition of the time, most notably Senators Juan Ponce Enrile, Vicente Sotto III, Gringo Honasan, Panfilo Lacson and Miriam Defensor-Santiago.

On the night of April 30, the scene turned violent as riot police fired warning shots and tear gas on crowds of supporters of ousted Philippines President Joseph Estrada. Some of the estimated 20,000 marchers had picked up the abandoned shields and raided a construction site for scrap wood to use as clubs.  Volleys of shots later rang out from a second line of officers, and again when the crowds reached the palace and tried to force their way into the fenced compound. They then broke through a third police line, the last before a phalanx of heavily armed officers that waited at Mendiola, a key bridge entrance to the presidential palace. A policeman, laying injured and bloody, was pelted with rocks by protesters. Marchers used a dump truck to break through an initial line of riot police who dropped their plastic shields and scattered. At least one person has died and many more have been injured as thousands of protestors clashed with riot police outside the presidential palace in Manila.

May 1
The rebellion sought to remove Arroyo from the presidency and to reinstate Estrada. The rebellion came to a head on the morning of May 1, 2001, as most of the people left, specifically the Iglesia ni Cristo members, as an agreement between their leaders and the government occurred. Yet hundreds of thousands of protesters still stormed towards Malacañang Palace, the presidential residence. Police and military forces dispersed the marchers with gunfire and tear gases, killing 3 civilians. Several broadcast vans of ABS-CBN were torched by members of the crowd, while others attacked the police and soldiers with rocks, sticks, and pipes. The police and military responded with force after implementing a "maximum tolerance" policy, which led to the injury of many of the protesters. President Arroyo declared a state of rebellion in the National Capital Region pursuant to Proclamation No. 38 and arrested leaders who participated in the said rebellion, such as Senator Juan Ponce Enrile, but released them on bail. She also announced the death of two police officers, expressing sympathy towards their families.

Aftermath
On May 7, 2001, President Arroyo lifted the notice of a state of rebellion. Hours after the crowds of EDSA III were dispersed, representatives of the Archdiocese of Manila and Civil Society supporters of the Arroyo administration reclaimed the EDSA Shrine where there had been alleged acts of vandalism and garbage everywhere and the vicinity reeked with the strong smell of human waste. 

Since this protest was carried out mostly by the lower income, uneducated masses, widespread destruction and vandalism of public utilities (stop lights and street posts where thrown down) crew cab of ABS-CBN were burned down and public stores fronting along the protest routes at Claro M. Recto Avenue, Legarda Street, Chino Roces (Mendiola) Street, Rizal Avenue, Nicanor Reyes (Morayta Street) and Quezon Boulevard. 

Most of those arrested were later set free. As for the public figures that supported the rallies, they abandoned them and shied away at its most critical time when it became obvious, that unlike the previous administrations, the Arroyo administration was not backing down from this latest people power styled protest which it perceived was political manipulation which resulted in mob mentality and anarchy of the masses urged by its political opponents.

Criticism
Critics of EDSA III, styled after the People Power Revolution (EDSA Revolution) and EDSA Revolution of 2001, argue that while this was a major protest, the spirit of it was unlike of the first and second protests. Supporters of EDSA III allege that EDSA's I and II's participants were made up of the professional–managerial class and as such not democratically representative unlike those who had participated in EDSA III. Other arguments also point to the success of the first two to remove the presidents targeted, versus this event's failure to do so.

See also
People Power Revolution
EDSA II
2015 INC Protests

References

External links
Ralliers tell their stories

Rebellions in the Philippines
2001 in the Philippines
Battles and conflicts without fatalities
History of the Philippines (1986–present)
History of Metro Manila
2001 riots
Protests in the Philippines
Attempted coups in the Philippines
Presidency of Gloria Macapagal Arroyo